The Cabinet of South Africa is the most senior level of the executive branch of the Government of South Africa. It is made up of the President, the Deputy President, and the Ministers.

Overview
The President appoints the Deputy President and ministers; assigns their powers and functions, and may dismiss them. The President may select any number of ministers from the members of the National Assembly, and may select no more than two ministers from outside the assembly. As of 2023 Cooperative Governance and Traditional Affairs Minister Thembi Nkadimeng and Electricity Minister Kgosientso Ramokgopa are the two cabinet ministers who are not members of the National Assembly. While Deputy Ministers are not members of the cabinet, they are required to assist relevant Ministers in the execution of their duties.

A member of the Cabinet is appointed by the President to be the leader of government business in the National Assembly.

History 
On 31 May 1910, former Boer military general and the former prime minister of the Transvaal Colony Louis Botha became the first Prime Minister of the newly established Union of South Africa—the forerunner of the modern South African state. He appointed the first cabinet of the Union of South Africa after the general election held on 15 September 1910. It consisted of members of the now-defunct South African Party. For the next fourteen years, it only consisted of members of the SAP. Botha died in 1919 and was replaced with another Boer general and SAP member, Jan Smuts.

In 1924, J. B. M. Hertzog of the National Party became prime minister through a coalition with the Labour Party and appointed a cabinet that consisted of National Party and Labour Party members. In 1934, the Hertzog's National Party and the South African Party merged to form the United Party. Hertzog won the 1938 general election, but in 1939 the United Party was divided between supporters of Hertzog and those of his Justice Minister Jan Smuts because of the question of South Africa's role in the Second World War. Hertzog was voted out in the United Party and resigned as prime minister, which allowed Jan Smuts to form a government in coalition with the Dominion Party and the Labour Party. The 1948 general election was won outright by D. F. Malan's Herenigde Nasionale Party and Malan appointed his first cabinet composed of National Party members. For the next forty-six years, South Africa would be governed by the National Party.

On 31 May 1961, South Africa became a republic and Queen Elizabeth II was replaced as head of state with a state president with largely ceremonial powers. The Prime Minister was still head of government and appointed/dismissed members of the cabinet. In 1984, the constitution was amended and the office of prime minister was abolished while the office of state president was given more responsibilities. State president P. W. Botha was now the head of state and head of government. In the 1984 tricameral parliamentary elections, Allan Hendrickse's Labour Party won a majority of seats in the coloured House of Representatives, while Amichand Rajbansi's National People's Party won a plurality of seats in the Indian House of Delegates. Hendrickse and Rajbansi were appointed to serve in Botha's second cabinet as Minister of Coloureds' Affairs and Minister of Indian Affairs, respectively, becoming the first non-white members of the South African cabinet.

In 1989, Rina Venter became the first woman to hold a cabinet post in South African history. Following the end of apartheid and the first multi-racial elections in 1994, Nelson Mandela became the first black President of South Africa and appointed a Government of National Unity consisting of African National Congress, National Party, and Inkatha Freedom Party members. In 1996, the National Party withdrew from the GNU and the cabinet's composition has been dominated by ANC members since then. The Inkatha Freedom Party continued to hold seats in the government, as minority partners, until the elections of 2004. In 2014, Lynne Brown became the first openly LGBT person to serve as a cabinet minister in South Africa and Africa.

In 2019, president Cyril Ramaphosa appointed the first gender-balanced cabinet in South African history.

Members of the current cabinet 
Cyril Ramaphosa was appointed as President of South Africa by parliament on 15 February 2018. On 26 February, he announced a major Cabinet reshuffle, including the appointment of David Mabuza as Deputy President. The President announced a cabinet reshuffle on 22 November 2018, following the death of Minister Edna Molewa and the resignation of Malusi Gigaba. On 29 May 2019, following the 2019 general election, President Ramaphosa announced a new cabinet in which the number of ministers was reduced from 36 to 28. On 5 August 2021, Cyril Ramaphosa announced another major Cabinet Reshuffle following the resignation of Minister Zweli Mkhize and Minister Tito Mboweni. The reshuffle also comes after the death of Minister Jackson Mthembu and deputy minister Bavilile Hlongwa. On 6 March 2023, Ramaphosa announced a major cabinet reshuffle following the resignation of David Mabuza as Deputy President.

Deputy Ministers
Deputy ministers are appointed by the President of South Africa. They are not members of the cabinet. They assist cabinet ministers in the execution of their duties. As of September 2021, these are the deputy ministers of South Africa.

Former ministerial portfolios 
The president may restructure cabinet at his discretion, meaning that ministerial portfolios may be changed or dissolved. Defunct ministerial portfolios include:

Lists of cabinets since 1910

 First Cabinet of Louis Botha, 1910–1915
 Second Cabet of Louis Botha, 1915–1919
 First Cabinet of Jan Smuts, 1920–1921
 Second Cabinet of Jan Smuts, 1921–1924
 First Cabinet of J.B.M Hertzog, 1924–1929
 Second Cabinet of J.B.M Hertzog, 1929–1933
 Third Cabinet of J.B.M Hertzog, 1933–1938
 Fourth Cabinet of J.B.M Hertzog, 1938–1943
 Third Cabinet of Jan Smuts, 1943–1948
 First Cabinet of D.F. Malan, 1948–1953
 Second Cabinet of D.F. Malan, 1953–1958
 Cabinet of Hans Strydom, 1958–1961
 First Cabinet of Hendrik Verwoerd, 1961–1966
 Second Cabinet of Hendrik Verwoerd, 1966
 First Cabinet of B.J. Vorster, 1966–1970
 Second Cabinet of B.J. Vorster, 1970–1974
 Third Cabinet of B.J. Vorster, 1974–1978
 First Cabinet of P.W. Botha, 1981–1984
 Second Cabinet of P.W. Botha, 1984–1989
 Cabinet of F.W. de Klerk, 1989–1994
 Cabinet of Nelson Mandela, 1994–1999
 First Cabinet of Thabo Mbeki, 1999–2004
 Second Cabinet of Thabo Mbeki, 2004–2008
 Cabinet of Kgalema Motlanthe, 2008–2009
 First Cabinet of Jacob Zuma, 2009–2014
 Second Cabinet of Jacob Zuma, 2014–2018
 First Cabinet of Cyril Ramaphosa, 2018–2019
 Second Cabinet of Cyril Ramaphosa, 2019–

References

Cabinets of South Africa
Executive branch of the government of South Africa
 
Government of South Africa
South Africa